Sphaerellocystis is a genus of green algae, in the family Palmellopsidaceae.

Species
, AlgaeBase accepted the following species:
Sphaerellocystis ampla (Kützing) Nováková
Sphaerellocystis aplanosporum H.W.Nichols, M.S.Nichols,.M.Thomas, J.S.Deacon & M.Veith
Sphaerellocystis ellipsoidea Ettl
Sphaerellocystis globosa Ettl
Sphaerellocystis lateralis Fott & Nováková
Sphaerellocystis pallens Ettl
Sphaerellocystis stellata Ettl
Sphaerellocystis stigmatica Ettl

References

External links

Scientific references

Scientific databases
 AlgaTerra database
 Index Nominum Genericorum

Chlamydomonadales genera
Chlamydomonadales